Isocoumarin (1H-2-benzopyran-1-one; 3,4-benzo-2-pyrone) is a lactone, a type of natural organic compound.

Known natural compounds 
 Thunberginol A and B

 dihydroisocoumarins
 Hydrangenol
 Phyllodulcin
 Thunberginol C, D, E and G
 The derivative 3-acetyl-3,4-dihydro-5,6-dimethoxy-1H-2-benzopyran-1-one can be found in Huáng bǎi (Phellodendron chinense), one of the fifty fundamental herbs of traditional Chinese medicine.

See also
 Coumarin

References